Rangárþing, or Rangárthing, may refer to a pair of Icelandic municipalities:

Rangárþing eystra
Rangárþing ytra

See also
Rangárvallasýsla, a county of Iceland